Paul Taggart (born 1980) is an American photographer and writer best known for his photographs from the Middle East and Africa.

Career
Taggart was one of the few unembedded western journalists to cover the month-long battle and siege of Najaf, Iraq in 2004 between the Mahdi Militia and the coalition forces.  Other prominent news stories Taggart has covered have been Benazir Bhutto's return to Pakistan in 2007 and the dual bombing of her convoy after leaving the airport, the Tsunami in Banda Aceh, the 2005 famine in Niger, the 2005 elections in Liberia, the 2006 war in Lebanon, and the 3-month-long siege of the Nahr al-Bared refugee camp in northern Lebanon in the summer of 2007.

Taggart's work has appeared in Newsweek, The New York Times, U.S. News & World Report, The Boston Globe, National Geographic Adventure, and The Times of London.

Kidnapping
In October 2004, Taggart was kidnapped while working in Sadr City outside of Baghdad, Iraq, and held hostage for three days before being released as a result of pleas from Muqtada Al Sadr.

See also
List of kidnappings

Sources
http://cjrarchives.org/issues/2005/1/voices-matloff.asp
Official Website
https://web.archive.org/web/20080614042632/http://www.cpj.org/Briefings/2003/gulf03/iraq_abducted.html
http://www.digitaljournalist.org/issue0711/between-the-airport-and-the-mausoleum.html
http://digitaljournalist.org/issue0602/dis_taggart.html
http://www.digitaljournalist.org/issue0712/kneel-before-the-fire.html
http://www.digitaljournalist.org/issue0608/the-sky-is-falling.html

U.S. Raids in 2 Sunni Cities Anger Clerics and Residents

References

1980 births
American photojournalists
American people taken hostage
Foreign hostages in Iraq
Kidnapped people
Living people
War photographers